Theodorus Antoon "Theo" Saat (13 May 1928 – 2 June 2015) was a Dutch sprinter.

Saat competed at the 1952 Summer Olympics in the 100 m and 200 m events, but failed to reach the finals. At the 1954 European Athletics Championships he finished in sixth place in the 100 m; he was also part of the Dutch team that set a national record in the 4 × 100 m relay in the preliminaries. He died in Noordwijk in 2015.

Results

References

1928 births
2015 deaths
Dutch male sprinters
Athletes (track and field) at the 1952 Summer Olympics
Olympic athletes of the Netherlands
Sportspeople from Arnhem